Disaster books are a literary genre involving detailed descriptions of major historical disasters, often based on the historical records or personal testimonies of survivors. Since reportage of both natural disasters and man-made disasters is commonplace, authors tend to be journalists who develop their news reports into books. While usually well written, they can lose sight of the causes, especially in man-made catastrophes where poor engineering, human error or negligence have combined to cause failure. On the other hand, authors who have been directly involved in an accident can reveal facts which have not been widely known, and provide insight into the problem.

Examples
An example of modern vintage is the publication of The High Girders in 1956 by the journalist John Prebble concerning Tay Bridge Disaster of December 28, 1879, one of the worst ever disasters on the rail network in Britain. It is a well composed book and written with good documentary accuracy, the author having accessed the many documents which have survived, especially the massive government report of 1880. On the other hand, he lacks confidence when discussing the engineering defects which lay at the heart of the accident. It did have a very positive benefit in stimulating others to write up their interpretation of the event, such as John Thomas in his New Light on the Tay Bridge Disaster published in 1972. He delved yet further into the archives and produced good evidence to show how faulty construction led directly to failure. Other recent authors such as Peter R Lewis in Beautiful Railway Bridge of the Silvery Tay (2004), have analysed the disaster from an engineering viewpoint, showing how design and construction defects led to destabilisation of the central part of the bridge.

The sinking of the RMS Titanic in April 1912 was vividly recreated by Walter Lord in his A Night to Remember published in 1955, a book that became a best-seller and still remains in print for its accuracy and detail. It was later dramatised in a film of the same name, and most recently in a Hollywood epic. Lord followed it in 1986 with another book on the disaster, revealing testimony from survivors who had hitherto remained silent. His work also stimulated exploration of the wreck itself by Robert Ballard, and much new information emerged from the direct evidence. The ship had broken into two halves during the final stages of the disaster, and each separate part ended up well apart from one another.

Genre publications

1703 Great Storm

1746 Lima Earthquake

1838 Stirling Castle Shipwreck

1839 New England Hurricanes

1846 Blenden Hall Shipwreck

1850 Nassau Bahama Tornado

1857 Desjardins Railway

1878 Wallingford Tornado

1889 Johnstown Flood

1891 Spring Hill Mine

1899 New Richmond tornado

1900 Galveston hurricane

1903 Iroquois Theater Fire

1906 San Francisco earthquake

1913 Great Dayton Flood and Omaha Easter Sunday Tornado

1913 Omaha Easter Sunday Tornado

1914 Empress of Ireland

See also
Disaster
Disaster films
Hyperbole

 
Non-fiction genres
Works about disasters